Miki Esparbé (born 9 October 1983) is a Spanish actor. He is known for his performances in Off Course, Barcelona, nit d'estiu, and Cuerpo de élite.

Biography 
Born in Manresa, Catalonia, on 9 October 1983, Esparbé earned a licentiate degree in Humanities from the Pompeu Fabra University. He trained in acting at the Nancy Tuñón's school in Barcelona. In his early career, he collaborated in El Terrat's television shows (Divendres and Palomitas).

Following a performance in the 2012 short film Double Check, his debut in a feature film came in 2013 with a performance in the Catalan-language film Barcelona, nit d'estiu. He earned further recognition to a Spain-wide audience with his performance in the 2015 film Off Course.

Filmography 

Television

Feature film

Awards and nominations

References 

People from Manresa
21st-century Spanish male actors
Spanish male television actors
Spanish male film actors
Living people
1983 births
Pompeu Fabra University alumni